Koivuranta is a Finnish surname. Notable people with the surname include:

 Ulla Koivuranta (born 1959), Finnish actress
 Marko Koivuranta (born 1978), Finnish footballer
 Tarmo Koivuranta (born 1980), Finnish footballer
 Anssi Koivuranta (born 1988), Finnish ski jumper

Finnish-language surnames